Pycnodithella is a genus of pseudoscorpions in the family Tridenchthoniidae. There are at least two described species in Pycnodithella.

Species
These two species belong to the genus Pycnodithella:
 Pycnodithella abyssinica (Beier, 1944)
 Pycnodithella harveyi Kennedy, 1989

References

Further reading

External links

 

Tridenchthoniidae
Pseudoscorpion genera